Imperial is a town in the Canadian province of Saskatchewan.  The town is located along Saskatchewan Highway 2.

Demographics 

See also 

 List of communities in Saskatchewan
 List of towns in Saskatchewan

Footnotes

External links

Towns in Saskatchewan
Big Arm No. 251, Saskatchewan
Division No. 11, Saskatchewan